Isaac Clinton "Clint" Miller (born May 24, 1939, Ferguson, North Carolina) is an American former rockabilly singer, attorney, and politician.  He served twenty-four years as a member of the Virginia House of Delegates and ten years as a judge on the Virginia State Corporation Commission.

Miller was raised in Woodstock, Virginia and began playing country music professionally as a teenager in the 1950s for Washington, DC-area stations such as WTOP and WMAL. He signed with ABC-Paramount Records in 1957, and the label gave him the tune "Bertha Lou", a recording of which the label had unsuccessfully attempted to license from Johnny Faire. Miller's version of the tune proved more successful on the charts, peaking at #79 on the Billboard Hot 100 in early 1958. He released a second single on ABC later that year and continued releasing singles into the early 1960s, though none of these charted. He would later record again in 1976 (a single) and 1993 (a three-track EP).

Miller was still in high school at the time of his chart success, and he graduated from the Stella Adler Theatre School in New York in 1961. He attended American University and then took a law degree at Washington & Lee University. 

He served from 1967 to 1971 as commonwealth's attorney for Shenandoah County and was elected to the Virginia House of Delegates in 1972 as a Republican.  He severed in the House through 1996. He ran for Governor of Virginia in the 1990s, but was not elected. Following this he worked in law until retiring in 2006.

References

1939 births
Living people
Virginia Republicans
American University alumni
Washington and Lee University School of Law alumni
People from Wilkes County, North Carolina